was a prolific Japanese film director, film producer, and screenwriter. His first accredited film, was released in 1953; his last, in 1985. He received several awards during his career, including the Japanese Academy Award for "Best Director" for his 1978 film The Demon.

Biography
Nomura was the son of Hotei Nomura, a contract film director at the Shochiku film studio. He entered Keio University to study art in 1936, graduated in 1941, and then joined the Shochiku studios as well. He was first hired as an assistant director but before being assigned any projects he was drafted into the army before being discharged in July 1946. In the fall of the same year, he returned to Shochiku and spent his entire film career working there. 

During his years as an assistant director, he worked under the helm of film directors as Keisuke Sasaki, Yuzo Kawashima, and Akira Kurosawa, whom he worked with in 1951 on the filming of The Idiot, based on the novel by Fyodor Dostoyevsky. In 1952, Nomura was promoted to director and made his directorial debut in 1953 with the film , which was such a success that the studio gave him five more films to direct the following year.

He is considered one of the pioneers of Japanese film noir and frequently collaborated with mystery writer Seichō Matsumoto, adapting eight of his works into films. Nomura directed 89 films in total. He worked in several different genres, including musicals and jidaigeki (period dramas), but was considered most proficient within the thriller genre. Nomura's films frequently contain veiled criticism of Japanese society. His 1974 thriller Castle of Sand, for which he won a diploma at the 9th Moscow International Film Festival in 1975, is considered by many critics as his best work. Nomura retired from directing in 1985, after which he worked as a TV producer and as consultant to other Japanese directors. In 1995, he was decorated by the Japanese Government with the Order of the Rising Sun, the second highest order of Japan.  

He died of pneumonia on 8 April 2005 in Shinjuku, Tokyo.

Retrospective
In 2014, the National Science and Media Museum in the UK organised a programme of five Nomura films, all of which were adaptations of Seichō Matsumoto stories.

Filmography as assistant director
 The Idiot (1951)
  (1951)
  (1952)
  (1952)
 (1952)
  (1953)

Filmography as Director

1950s
  (1952)
  (1952)
  (1953)
  (1953)
  (1953)
  (1953)
  (1953)
 Izu no Odoriko (1954)
  (1954)
  (1954)
  (1954)
  (1955)
  (1955)
  (1955)
  (1955)
  (1955)
  (1955)
  (1956)
  (1956)
  (1956)
  (1956)
  (1956)
  (1956)
  (1957)
  (1958)
  (1958)
  (1958)
  (1958)
  (1959)

1960s
  (1960)
  (1960)
  (1960)
  (1960)
  (1961)
  (1961)
  (1961)
  (1962)
  (1962)
  (1962)
  (1962)
  (1963)
  (1963)
  (1963)
  (1964)
  (1964)
  (1964)
  (1965)
  (1966)
  (1966)
  (1966)
  (1966)
  (1966)
  (1967)
  (1967)
  (1967)
  (1967)
  (1968)
  (1968)
  (1968)
  (1969)
  (1969)
  (1969)
  (1969)

1970s
  (1970)
  (1970)
  (1970)
  (1970)
  (1970)
  (1971)
  (1971)
  (1971)
  (1972)
  (1973)
  (1973)
 Castle of Sand (1974)
  (1974)
  (1975)
  (1977)
 The Incident (1978)
 The Demon (1978)
  (1979) based on a novel by Ellery Queen

1980s
  (1980)
  (1980)
  (1981)
 Suspicion (1982)
  (1983)
  (1984)
  (1985)

References

External links
 
 JMDb Yoshitaro Nomura listing 
 In Remembrance: Yoshitaro Nomura

1919 births
2005 deaths
Japanese film directors
Japan Academy Prize for Director of the Year winners
People from Tokyo